Pearl Franklyn Webster (July 8, 1889 – November 16, 1918), nicknamed "Specks", was an American baseball catcher and first baseman in the Negro leagues. He played from 1914 to 1918 with several teams.

In 1918, while playing for the Hilldale Club, Webster was drafted into the Army in Class 1-A.

He died of the Spanish flu pandemic while serving in the United States Army during World War I.

Thirty-four years after his death, Webster received votes listing him on the 1952 Pittsburgh Courier player-voted poll of the Negro leagues' best players ever.

References

External links

 Pearl Franklyn "Specks" Webster at Find a Grave

1889 births
1918 deaths
Bacharach Giants players
Brooklyn Royal Giants players
Hilldale Club players
Lincoln Stars (baseball) players
St. Louis Giants players
Baseball players from Missouri
United States Army personnel of World War I
African Americans in World War I
Deaths from the Spanish flu pandemic in France
People from Clark County, Missouri
American military personnel killed in World War I
Baseball catchers
African-American United States Army personnel